Jason Elliot Ross (born February 7, 1989) is an American DJ and record producer. Currently living in Los Angeles, California, he is signed to UK-based record label, Anjunabeats, and Seven Lions' label Ophelia Records. He released his debut album, 1000 Faces, on January 24, 2020.

Jason Ross is best known for producing melodic bass, trance and progressive house music. In addition to originals, he has remixed Above & Beyond, Seven Lions, Illenium, SLANDER and Gryffin.

He has released singles and remixes for numerous electronic record labels. His first ever original release, ‘Nightfall’ came out on Darren Tate's trance record label Mondo Records in 2013. In 2014 Above & Beyond took notice of the budding producer and signed him to their Anjunabeats imprint, it was the label's first signing in two years. The 2014 DJMag Top 100 DJs poll included a comment from Above & Beyond mentioning Jason Ross as their breakthrough DJ / producer of 2014: “On the Anjunabeats side, Jason Ross is a real talent”. Several of his songs have been included in numerous compilation albums such as the Monster Tunes Miami 2014 and Anjunabeats Volume 12 compilations. Ross has been featured in performances by artists all across the industry, playing alongside both mainstream headliners like Tiesto and Avicii, and trance legends like Ferry Corsten, Markus Schulz, which "has allowed him to understand the art of reading crowds and always leave them wanting more."

As well as his solo releases, Ross has worked alongside other DJs and producers such as Above & Beyond, Wrechiski, Sunny Lax, and Jenaux. He has hosted a guest mix on Above & Beyond's Group Therapy Radio show which is broadcast to millions of people worldwide. Ross and Wrechiski's collaboration "Atlas" got its debut at Madison Square Garden during the Above & Beyond Group Therapy 100 event. It was described as "an instrumental record with a really powerful almost melancholic vibe" by British record producer Paul Oakenfold. On January 26, 2015, "Atlas" reached the number one spot on Beatport's trance music chart.

Early life

Jason Ross grew up in Minneapolis, Minnesota. At a young age, around 12-years-old, he was introduced to electronic music for the first time. Originally trained as a classical and jazz musician, Jason switched gears early on when he heard ATB's "9PM (Till I Come)" and Darude's Sandstorm. He purchased the software, eJay and produced his first electronic album before he was a teenager. Jason attended San Diego State University where he began his first club residency at the Fluxx nightclub.

Discography

Studio albums

Compilation albums

Extended plays

Singles

Remixes

References 

1989 births
American DJs
Living people
Musicians from Minneapolis
Anjunabeats artists